Albin Valjakka (10 July 1877, Mikkelin maalaiskunta – 29 June 1918) was a Finnish journalist and politician. He was a Member of the Parliament of Finland from 1907 to 1918, representing the Social Democratic Party of Finland (SDP). During the Finnish Civil War of 1918, Valjakka sided with the Reds, was arrested in Viipuri by White troops on 7 May and died in detention on 29 June 1918.

References

1877 births
1918 deaths
People from Mikkeli
People from Mikkeli Province (Grand Duchy of Finland)
Social Democratic Party of Finland politicians
Members of the Parliament of Finland (1907–08)
Members of the Parliament of Finland (1908–09)
Members of the Parliament of Finland (1909–10)
Members of the Parliament of Finland (1910–11)
Members of the Parliament of Finland (1911–13)
Members of the Parliament of Finland (1913–16)
Members of the Parliament of Finland (1916–17)
Members of the Parliament of Finland (1917–19)
20th-century Finnish journalists
People of the Finnish Civil War (Red side)
Prisoners who died in Finnish detention
Finnish people who died in prison custody